Justine Cooper is an Australian artist born in Sydney, Australia in 1968 and is currently residing in New York.

Life and career
Cooper is an interdisciplinary artist investigating the intersections between culture, science and medicine. Cooper uses various media to create her artworks, including animation, video, and photography, and she frequently incorporates medical imaging technologies including MRI, ultrasound, DNA sequencing, scanning electron microscopy into her works.

Cooper's work has been exhibited at The New Museum of Contemporary Art, New York; the Singapore Art Museum, the Netherlands Media Art Institute and at the NTT InterCommunication Center, Tokyo, RiAus in Adelaide, and in the exhibition WetLab: The New Nexus Between Art and Science in 2005.

Cooper’s artwork is represented in the Metropolitan Museum of Art, The Powerhouse Museum (Sydney), The Queensland Art Gallery and the Australian Center for the Moving Image, amongst other public and private collections.

Her 1998 work Trap - self portrait uses Magnetic Resonance Imaging (MRI) scans of the artist's own brain.

Works
Trap - self portrait (1998)
Moist (2002)
Havidol (2007)

References

Further reading
Coombes, Rebecca. "Medicine and the Media: Having the last laugh at big pharma." BMJ: British Medical Journal 334.7590 (2007): 396.
Gigliotti, Carol. "Leonardo’s choice: the ethics of artists working with genetic technologies." Leonardo’s Choice. Springer Netherlands, 2009. 61-74.

External links
 http://www.justinecooper.com/

1968 births
Living people
20th-century Australian women artists
20th-century Australian artists
21st-century Australian women artists
21st-century Australian artists
Australian digital artists
Women digital artists
New media artists
Interdisciplinary artists